The Greatest American Hero is an American comedy-drama superhero television series that aired on ABC. Created by producer Stephen J. Cannell, it premiered as a two-hour pilot movie on March 18, 1981, and ran until February 2, 1983. The series features William Katt as teacher Ralph Hinkley, Robert Culp as FBI agent Bill Maxwell, and Connie Sellecca as lawyer Pam Davidson. The lead character's surname was changed from "Hinkley" to "Hanley" for the latter part of the first season, immediately after President Ronald Reagan and three others were shot and wounded by John Hinckley Jr. on March 30, 1981. The character's name was reverted to "Hinkley" after a few months had passed.

The series chronicles Ralph's adventures after a group of aliens gives him a red and black suit that grants him superhuman abilities. Unfortunately for Ralph, who hates wearing the suit, he immediately loses its instruction booklet, and thus has to learn how to use its powers by trial and error, often with comical results.

Premise
Ralph Hinkley (Katt) is a Los Angeles public school substitute teacher of remedial education high school students. During a school field trip, Ralph encounters extraterrestrials who give him a suit which endows him with superhuman abilities. Also during the encounter, he is instructed by the aliens to thereafter collaborate with FBI Special Agent Bill Maxwell (Culp). Their instructions are to use the suit as a means to fight crime and injustice in the world.

Subsequently, attorney Pam Davidson (Sellecca), who handled Ralph's divorce, also encounters the aliens. Through some coercion, she eventually agrees, on occasion, to join Ralph and Bill during missions.

Also seen regularly were Rhonda Blake (Faye Grant), Tony Villicana (Michael Paré), and Cyler Johnson (Jesse D. Goins), three of Ralph's students; and Bill's FBI supervisor Les Carlisle (William Bogert).

Suit and hero persona
Ralph's uniform grants him the powers of flight, super strength,super speed, invulnerability, invisibility, precognition, telekinesis, X-ray vision, super speed, pyrokinesis, shrinking, psychometry ("holographic vision"), and even the ability to detect the supernatural. As Ralph lost the suit's instruction manual, his discovery of these different powers often come as a surprise even to himself. Notably, while the suit enables Ralph to fly, it does not endow him with any particular skill at landing, so he frequently crashes in an undignified (though uninjured) heap. In the episode "Fire Man" he displays resistance to fire/heat and uses "super exhalation" (the ability to blow out a flamethrower, or any other large source of fire); he also uses this ability in the episode "There's Just No Accounting ...", to extinguish a Molotov cocktail. Ralph also shows signs of being able to control minds after he is exposed to high doses of plutonium radiation. In the season two final episode, "Lilacs, Mr. Maxwell", Ralph is shown to control a dog via a hologram. This may have been an improvisational power of the suit, but is not tried again in later episodes. In "The Shock Will Kill You", he (or the suit) becomes strongly magnetized.

In the season two episode "Don't Mess Around with Jim", Ralph and Maxwell learn they are not the first duo who received such a uniform. Jim "J.J." Beck had received the suit, and Marshall Dunn was his partner, much like Ralph and Maxwell operated. But Jim was overwhelmed with the power of the suit, and he used it selfishly and for ill-gotten gains, until the aliens discovered this and took the suit away. It is unknown whether or not there were others before Jim who were visited by the aliens. In "Divorce Venusian Style", the pair meet one of the aliens, whose world was apparently destroyed (which hints as to why the aliens want to protect humanity) and calls Earth one of the few remaining "garden planets". Ralph is given another instruction book during this encounter—supposedly the aliens' last copy, but he loses it as well. When he shrinks to a fraction of normal size, he places it on a large boulder which is actually a grain of sand given his reduced size, and forgets to pick it back up before returning to normal size.

In the episode "Vanity, Says the Preacher", it is also revealed there are several humans in seeming "suspended animation" aboard the aliens' ship (Bill speculates that they are possible replacements for them).

Hinkley's hero persona never receives an actual "superhero name" either, although Joey Scarbury sings the Elton John song "Rocket Man" in the pilot. In the pilot episode, Ralph sarcastically refers to himself as "Captain Crash" in reference to his terrible flying ability; and later "Captain Gonzo" in the episode "The Shock Could Kill You".

Like his character, William Katt found the suit very uncomfortable and hated wearing it. Producers made various modifications to the suit to help him, and accommodated him by scheduling filming so he would not have to wear it all day during a shoot.

Symbol
On the Season 1 DVD, Stephen J. Cannell notes that the symbol design on the front of the suit is actually based on a pair of scissors that he had on his desk during the design of the uniform. He said that the costume designer asked him what he wanted the suit's chest emblem to look like. He said he had not really thought about it. The designer then picked the scissors up off the desk, held them upside down, and said "That's your emblem". Cannell was fine with that decision.

The symbol on Ralph's uniform resembles the Chinese character for "center" . As the symbol is red in color with white background, Hong Kong television station TVB titled the Cantonese-dubbed version of the show Fēi Tīn Hùhng Jūng Hahp, meaning "Flying Red Center Hero", in reference to the red center mahjong tile. An alternate translation of "jūng" in Cantonese is "justice", which gave the other meaning for the title of the show "Flying Red Justice Hero". This alternate translation of the show title allude to the mandate by the alien grantor to use the suit as a means to fight crime and injustice in the world. 

The symbol's bilateral symmetry seemingly avoided the "backward S" problem encountered on the Adventures of Superman. For the low-budget 1950s series, editors would on occasion "flop" stock footage of George Reeves in flight, causing the "S" shield to appear reversed. However, in many Greatest American Hero composite flying sequences, Ralph wore a watch and the timepiece alternates from one wrist to the other, especially during extended flying sequences.

Cast and characters
 William Katt as Ralph Hinkley/Ralph Hanley
 Robert Culp as Bill Maxwell
 Connie Sellecca as Pam Davidson
 Faye Grant as Rhonda Blake
 Michael Paré as Tony Villicana
 Jesse D. Goins as Cyler Johnson
 William Bogert as Les Carlisle

Ralph's surname
The main character's name was originally Ralph Hinkley, but after the assassination attempt on Ronald Reagan by John Hinckley, Jr., on March 30, 1981, the character's last name was hurriedly changed to "Hanley" in two episodes. In "Saturday on Sunset Boulevard", aired within days of the incident, this was accomplished by overdubbing dialogue (i.e. "Hinkley" to "Hanley") whenever the character's last name was spoken aloud. For the rest of the first season, the character was generally referred to as either "Ralph" or "Mister H", although in "The Best Desk Scenario", when Ralph is given a promotion and his own office space, we see the name "Ralph Hanley" on the door plaque. By the season 2 premiere, "The Two-Hundred-Mile-an-Hour Fast Ball", the show's producers returned the character's surname to the original Hinkley.

Episodes

Production
On the series' season 1 DVD set Stephen J. Cannell explained that he had planned The Greatest American Hero as a series emphasizing real-life problems, whereas when a change of management occurred in ABC, they requested more heroic, save-the-day-type episodes. As agreed originally between Cannell and then ABC executives Marcy Carsey and Tom Werner, the powers would be in the suit, not the man (though the suit would only work for him) and Ralph would try to solve ordinary-type problems, such as trying to stop corruption in Major League Baseball ("The Two Hundred Miles-Per-Hour Fastball") or an assassination attempt ("The Best Desk Scenario"). The series initially emphasized what Cannell referred to as "character comedy" based on human flaws such as envy (in the aforementioned "The Best Desk Scenario") or hypochondria ("Plague"). The series differed from previous superhero shows because of the emphasis on (especially Ralph) "rising above" superhero antics and instead exploring what it was like to live in that environment.

Cannell was trying to avoid save-the-day-type episodes, as per the original Adventures of Superman television series, but according to Cannell on the DVD set, when Carsey and Werner left ABC (soon after the show was purchased by the network) the new network executives wanted the show to be more like a children's show than an adults' show. So they pushed for the types of shows that Cannell did not want, shows that involved Ralph trying to stop some sort of calamity from happening, including nuclear war ("Operation Spoilsport") and even a Loch Ness Monster-type of creature ("The Devil in the Deep Blue Sea"). For the season two finale, a serious and appropriate for the time (considering the Cold War) episode was produced; "Lilacs, Mr. Maxwell", written and directed by Robert Culp. The episode's story concerns a KGB mole-agent (played by guest actor Dixie Carter) placed into the FBI with the sole purpose of discovering the methods used by agent Bill Maxwell in catching spies and other assorted villains. Cannell gave Culp free rein to produce the episode.

This was also the first of Cannell's series to feature the "Stephen J. Cannell Productions" logo. The production company's first series Tenspeed and Brown Shoe did not feature the logo.

Theme song

The theme song (and variants of it) have been used frequently outside of the show. "Believe It or Not" was composed by Mike Post (music) and Stephen Geyer (lyrics) and sung by Joey Scarbury. The theme song became well known during the show's run. "Believe it or Not" debuted in the Top 40 of the Billboard Hot 100, peaking at No. 2. It also peaked at the No. 1 position on the Record World chart.

Superman connections
The powers of the red suit were somewhat general, but still were similar enough to the abilities of Superman that Warner Bros., the owners of DC Comics, filed a lawsuit against ABC. Warner Bros. Inc. v. American Broadcasting Companies, Inc. was ultimately dismissed. However, the series has more inspiration owed to another DC property, Green Lantern, in that it shares the basic concept of an ordinary human being given a powerful weapon granting extraordinary abilities by extraterrestrials, including the later appearance in the series of an alien who is loosely reminiscent of the Green Lantern Corps' administrators, the Guardians of the Universe. It also shares the same concept of another DC property, Starman, in that it shares the basic concept of an ordinary human being is given a red costume, and given a powerful weapon granting extraordinary abilities by extraterrestrials. The series is also very similar to Nova from Marvel Comics, in that it shares the basic concept of an ordinary person attending school being given a powerful weapon granting extraordinary abilities by extraterrestrials, including the later appearance in the series of an alien who is loosely reminiscent of the Nova Corps' administrators, the Xandarians. The concept was also very similar to Frog-Man, a former supervillain, and now one of Spider-Man's allies, as well as the superhero by the name of Ant-Man, Scott Lang (all three of them, also created by Marvel Comics), to which a non-superpowered person attending school is given a red costume that grants them extraordinary abilities and superpowers to fight off crime and bring evil to justice.

In the pilot episode, while Ralph ponders whether to accept the suit, he observes his son watching the Super Friends cartoon. Batman is heard to say, "We need one more Super Friend who can fly!" In a later scene, having yet to convince Pam he really is a superhero, Ralph jokes, "Look at it this way. You're one step ahead of Lois Lane: she never found out who Clark Kent really was." In "Saturday on Sunset Boulevard", Ralph needs to change his clothing quickly. Seeing a telephone booth, he grumbles, "No! Never!", but ends up using it. Later, while Ralph struggles to get changed in the back of Bill's car, Bill notes "We need to get you a bigger phone booth."

Home media
Anchor Bay Entertainment company released the complete series in DVD format in Region 1 for the first time during 2005. Additionally, on October 3, 2006, they released a special 13-disc boxed set that includes all 43 episodes of the series as well as other bonus material. However, both the individual DVD sets and the complete boxed set are missing original performances by Mike Post and Joey Scarbury whenever the song concerned originated by another artist.

On October 14, 2009, it was announced that Mill Creek Entertainment company had acquired the rights to several Stephen J. Cannell series, including The Greatest American Hero. They subsequently re-released the first season as well as a complete series box set on May 18, 2010. Season 2 was re-released on October 12, 2010.

On November 10, 2011, Mill Creek Entertainment released The Greatest American Heroine TV movie on DVD.

On September 26, 2017, Cinedigm re-released The Greatest American Hero: The Complete Series on DVD in Region 1.

Shout! Factory acquired the distribution rights to The Greatest American Hero and The Greatest American Heroine along with several other Stephen J. Cannell series on March 11, 2020.

On June 30, 2022, Visual Entertainment released The Greatest American Hero: The Complete Collection on DVD in Region 1.

Revivals

The Greatest American Heroine
During 1986, the original principal cast reunited for a pilot movie for a new NBC series to be named The Greatest American Heroine, which did not result in a new series, and the pilot was never broadcast by NBC. Ultimately, the pilot was re-edited as an episode of the original series (complete with original opening credits and theme), and added to syndication sets of the original series aired on several local television stations in the late 1980s, for which it is the final episode. Immediately after the beginning credits, the episode's title card is superimposed over a nighttime view of the Los Angeles skyline, reading "The Greatest American Hero" before appending the letters "i n e" individually to the sound of the NBC chimes. The chimes were a nod to NBC and its president, Brandon Tartikoff, who had expressed interest in reviving the series.

The pilot movie reveals that, several years after the final episode, Ralph's secret identity was finally revealed to the public, resulting in his becoming a celebrity. This angers the aliens who gave him the suit, and they charge him with finding a new hero to wear the costume and use its powers for fighting evil. Once the transfer is made, they explain, all memory of Ralph's exploits will be purged from the world's memory and remembered only by Ralph, Pam, and Bill.

Bill begins their search by researching people with desired hero qualities, but Ralph finds a young woman named Holly Hathaway (Mary Ellen Stuart), an elementary school teacher who spends her off-hours time looking for lost kittens, raising environmental awareness, and serving as a foster mother. Bill, Pam, and Ralph meet in the desert, where Ralph tells Bill about Holly. He reacts visibly to his new partner being a "skirt" before Holly arrives, flying in wearing a new version of the suit made for her, and she pledges to help Bill. The original trio say their final farewells, and even the stoic Maxwell reveals his true emotions as he says goodbye to Ralph and calling Pam a trooper—"...one of the best!" Holly reacts emotionally to the fond farewells, but breaks the somber mood as she accidentally pulls the door off of Bill's sedan.

The rest of the episode deals with Holly learning how to use the suit with Bill Maxwell's guidance, and the pair trying to develop a working relationship. It ends with Bill overhearing a conversation between Holly and her foster daughter in which Holly refers to Bill as a good person. Bill is then shown speaking into a recorder he uses as his "diary" to suggest that maybe Holly is the right person to wear the suit after all.

Remake
On August 29, 2014, Deadline Hollywood published an article reporting that the Fox Network had ordered a pilot for a new version of the show. The pilot was to be produced by Phil Lord and Christopher Miller, both of whom wrote and directed The Lego Movie.

Deadline reported on September 8, 2017, that Rachna Fruchbom and Nahnatchka Khan will produce a female-led remake for 20th Century Fox TV and ABC Studios. The suit will be donned by Meera, an Indian-American woman. Actress Hannah Simone was cast as the lead for the reboot.

On February 12, 2018, Simone was announced as the lead in ABC's reboot; however, ABC declined to pick up the series.

Comics
During July 2008, it was announced that Katt was writing a comic book series based on the television series for his publishing company, Catastrophic Comics, in conjunction with Arcana Studios. The three-issue mini-series debuted later that year, featuring an updated retelling of the original pilot episode set in the present. Katt also contributes to the show's Facebook page.

See also
 Reluctant hero – a heroic archetype found in fiction, typically portrayed as an everyman forced to rise to heroism, or as a person with unwanted special abilities

References

External links
 
 

 
1980s American comedy-drama television series
1980s American comic science fiction television series
1981 American television series debuts
1983 American television series endings
American Broadcasting Company original programming
American superhero comedy television series
Attempted assassination of Ronald Reagan
English-language television shows
Saturn Award-winning television series
Television shows adapted into comics
Television series by Stephen J. Cannell Productions
Television shows set in Los Angeles
Television series created by Stephen J. Cannell